Ekwerazu Ogwa is a village in southeastern Nigeria. Also, it is located near the city of Owerri.

References 

Towns in Imo State